Stilbotis is a genus of moths of the Noctuidae family.

References
Natural History Museum Lepidoptera genus database

Noctuinae